The third season of the Naruto: Shippuden anime series is directed by Hayato Date, and produced by Studio Pierrot and TV Tokyo. They are based on Part II for Masashi Kishimoto's manga series. The third season aired from April to August 2008 on TV Tokyo. Titled in Japan ,<ref name="series3title">{{cite web|url=http://www.sonymusicshop.jp/detail.asp?goods=ANSB000002671|publisher=Aniplex|title=Naruto: Shippuden DVD Series Three title|access-date=2009-06-06|language=ja}}</ref> the anime only season follows Naruto Uzumaki attempting to protect Asuma Sarutobi's monk named Sora and defeat Team Furido. It is also the first season to be produced in 16:9 widescreen, instead of 4:3, which was the aspect ratio of all previous seasons.

The season was released on three DVDs in Japan between September 3 and November 5, 2008 by Aniplex. The English dub began airing on Disney XD on October 28, 2009, with the season aired between November 3, 2010 and March 9, 2011. The season ran on Adult Swim's Toonami programming block from February 15 to June 21, 2015.

Viz Media also released it in two DVD boxes on January 25 and April 26, 2011. Manga Entertainment released it in two boxes in the United Kingdom on May 16 and July 11, 2011.

The second feature film for the series, Naruto Shippuden The Movie: Bonds'', was released on August 2, 2008. The broadcast versions of episodes 70 and 71 include scenes from the film in the opening themes, while still retaining the original music.


Episode list

Home releases

Japanese

English

References
General
 
 

Specific

2008 Japanese television seasons
Shippuden Season 03